Mount Hermon is an unincorporated community and census-designated place (CDP) in Santa Cruz County, California.

History

In 1841, California's first water-powered sawmill was built at the junction of Bean Creek and Zayante Creek by Peter Lassen, Isaac Graham, J. Majors, and F. Hoeger.

Mount Hermon, known as "Tuxedo Junction" prior to 1906, was a stop on the South Coast Pacific Railroad from Alameda to Santa Cruz. Hotel Tuxedo was on the property; the hotel was purchased and renamed the Zayante Inn on April 14, 1906, by a group which later became the Mount Hermon Association, Inc. Five ladies of the group were entrusted with the selection of a new name for the area, and they chose that of the peak in the Holy Land.  The land was to be used as a Christian retreat center, whose dedication day, known as "The Great Day", was July 22, 1906; the event was held at the Zayante Inn with 1400 people in attendance. Speaking at the dedication was Dr. Reuben A. Torrey, President of the Moody Bible Institute in Chicago, Illinois.

The Zayante Inn and surrounding cottages were destroyed by fire on April 18, 1921. At the site, the Mount Hermon Christian Conference Center, with three separate facilities, operates on much of the original property. There are also several hundred privately owned homes, the Mount Hermon post office, and a bookstore.

Geography

Demographics
The 2010 United States Census reported that Mount Hermon had a population of 1,037. The racial makeup of Mount Hermon was 964 (93.0%) White, 6 (0.6%) African American, 3 (0.3%) Native American, 14 (1.4%) Asian, 1 (0.1%) Pacific Islander, 18 (1.7%) from other races, and 31 (3.0%) from two or more races. Hispanic or Latino of any race were 83 persons (8.0%).

The Census reported that 100% of the population lived in households.

There were 408 households, out of which 128 (31.4%) had children under the age of 18 living in them, 204 (50.0%) were opposite-sex married couples living together, 44 (10.8%) had a female householder with no husband present, 17 (4.2%) had a male householder with no wife present.  There were 27 (6.6%) unmarried opposite-sex partnerships, and 6 (1.5%) same-sex married couples or partnerships. 100 households (24.5%) were made up of individuals, and 25 (6.1%) had someone living alone who was 65 years of age or older. The average household size was 2.54.  There were 265 families (65.0% of all households); the average family size was 3.06.

The population was spread out, with 237 people (22.9%) under the age of 18, 81 people (7.8%) aged 18 to 24, 278 people (26.8%) aged 25 to 44, 342 people (33.0%) aged 45 to 64, and 99 people (9.5%) who were 65 years of age or older.  The median age was 39.0 years. For every 100 females, there were 94.2 males.  For every 100 females age 18 and over, there were 93.2 males.

The homeowner vacancy rate was 0%; the rental vacancy rate was 5.3%. 54.6% of the population lived in owner-occupied housing units and 45.4% lived in rental housing units.

Notable people
 Jordan Beck, NFL football player
 Joy Williams, singer – moved here with her family in 1993 when her father became CEO of Mount Hermon Christian Camps and Conference Center

References

External links
 Santa Cruz Wiki - The People's Guide to Santa Cruz County, California.
 Mount Hermon Christian Conference Center
 Santa Cruz Public Libraries History of Mount Hermon
 Mount Hermon's Outdoor Science School

Census-designated places in Santa Cruz County, California
Unincorporated communities in Santa Cruz County, California
1841 establishments in Alta California
Census-designated places in California
Unincorporated communities in California